Matteo Ricci (born 4 February 1994) is an Italian footballer who plays as a goalkeeper.

History
On 3 July 2015, Ricci was signed by Livorno.

On 5 September 2019, he returned to Livorno.

On 30 March 2021, he joined Serie C club Carpi, after two of their goalkeepers (Andrea Rossini and Alessio Pozzi) were injured.

References

External links
 
 

1994 births
Living people
Sportspeople from Lucca
Italian footballers
Association football goalkeepers
Empoli F.C. players
S.S. Milazzo players
U.S. Città di Pontedera players
U.S. Pistoiese 1921 players
U.S. Livorno 1915 players
S.C. Olhanense players
Olbia Calcio 1905 players
S.S. Teramo Calcio players
U.S. Massese 1919 players
A.C. Carpi players
Serie B players
Serie C players
Liga Portugal 2 players
Italy youth international footballers
Italian expatriate footballers
Italian expatriate sportspeople in Portugal
Expatriate footballers in Portugal
Footballers from Tuscany